Payson Jackson Treat (November 12, 1879 – June 15, 1972) was an American Japanologist. He was born in New York City on November 12, 1879, and attended Wesleyan University as an undergraduate. He then attained a master's degree at Columbia. He started teaching at Stanford University in 1905, and was appointed a professor of history there in 1906—the first professorship in Far Eastern history at an American university. Treat received a doctorate at Stanford in 1910, working on the history of the American land system as a student of Max Farrand. In 1921, he was a visiting lecturer at the Imperial University of Tokyo and the University of Hong Kong. He retired in 1945 after teaching at Stanford for 40 years, but remained in Stanford, California, where he died on June 15, 1972. Until his death, Treat maintained an index card file relating the names and children of over 7,000 of his students.

Selected works

References

External links
 

Writers from New York City
Historians of Japan
American Japanologists
Stanford University Department of History faculty
Wesleyan University alumni
Columbia University alumni
20th-century American historians
American male non-fiction writers
1879 births
1972 deaths
20th-century American male writers